RPM Tuning, also titled Top Gear RPM Tuning and as Midnight Outlaw: Six Hours To Sun Up for Microsoft Windows, is a racing video game developed by French studio Babylon Software and published by Wanadoo Edition in 2004 for Windows, PlayStation 2 and Xbox. It is part of the Top Gear game series. A PlayStation 2 version was not released in North America.

Plot 
The plot takes place in 2003 and is about Vince, an underground driver who is looking for a car. A GTSR model (the best in the game) his only clues are the name RedSet and the premises of a mechanic, a reference point for car enthusiasts in the area. Vince enters. The mechanic tells him to leave if it's for an oil change, but Vince explains that he is looking for a car and the mechanic replies that this is different and lets him choose his car from three models: the Hatchback si, the Pick up 150 or the 322 ci. Then he meets Rick, an underground racer with his two henchmen: Mac and Dante. After a few races, he meets Carmen, the mechanic's daughter, and Lewis, his brother. The mechanic offers him an exchange for the GT coupe, as his is still new. After a while Rick introduces him to Mike, Lucy and then Donny, his mechanic, who offers him an exchange for the Horse V8, the second fastest car in the game. Later the thief turns out to be Rick, who was trying to sell it to a policeman called McCullen with a plan not to get caught. In one part you fight Dante, then Rick. After Carmen, who used to hate Vince, now has fallen in love with him, shoots Rick and it turns out it was him who wanted to sell the GTSR, just from a briefcase full of money that Vince will find in the boot of Rick's car.

Reception 

The Xbox version received "generally unfavourable reviews" according to the review aggregation website Metacritic.

References

External links 
 RPM Tuning at Microïds
 

2004 video games
Microïds games
PlayStation 2 games
Racing video games
Top Gear (video game series)
Video games developed in France
Video games set in 2003
Windows games
Xbox games
RenderWare games